The FIS Snowboarding World Championships 2011 was an international snowboarding competition held from January 14 to 22, 2011, in La Molina and Barcelona (Catalonia, Spain) by the FIS Snowboarding World Championship,

All the competitions were held in La Molina, except the big air competition, which was held in Barcelona.

Organisation

Media and marketing
The TV broadcast rights were sold to Eurosport in Europe, CBC in Canada, Sky A in Japan, and ORF was given the rights to broadcast in Austria.

Venues
The world championships began with the big air competition at the Palau Sant Jordi arena in Barcelona. The remaining events all took place in La Molina beginning on January 17. La Molina is two hours north of Barcelona in the Pyrenees and is the oldest ski resort in Spain.

Similar to the 2010 Winter Olympics, the La Molina venue suffered from excessive warmth which threatened the events for the World Championships. Much of the surrounding slopes were barren of snow as most of the remaining snow was piled on the courses and venues for the event.

Results

Men's events

Original silver medalist Zachary Stone of Canada was stripped of the silver medal, because he tested positive for cannabis.

Women's events

Medal table
17 countries won medals at these championships, a new record. The Czech Republic and New Zealand won their first medals at the World Snowboarding Championships, while Belgium won its first ever gold medal.

Participating nations 
A record of 370 participants from 44 nations competed. Canada has sent the biggest team with 47 entries and 31 athletes, while Montenegro only sent a delegation of one.

  (2)
 
 
 
 
  (2)
 
  (31)
 
 
 
 
 
 
  (21)
 
  (2)
 
 
 
 
 
  (2)
  (4)
  (1)
 
 
 
  (1)
 
 
 
 
 
 
 
 
 
  (21)
 
 
 
 
  (21)

References

2011
Snowboarding World Championships
FIS Snowboarding World Championships
Snowboarding World Championships 2011
2011
2011